Thornton is a village and civil parish on the River Great Ouse about  north-east of Buckingham in the unitary authority area of Buckinghamshire.

The toponym is derived from the Old English for "thorn tree by a farm".  The Domesday Book of 1086 records the village as Ternitone.

The earliest record of the Church of England Church of Saint Michael and All Angels dates from 1219. The present building is 14th-century, but was dramatically restored between 1770 and 1800 and largely rebuilt by the Gothic Revival architect John Tarring in 1850. The restorers retained mediaeval features including the 14th-century belltower, chancel arch and clerestory and 15th century clerestory windows.

The Tudor Revival Thornton Hall (now Thornton College) was also built to John Tarring's designs in 1850. It incorporates parts of a medieval house modernised in the 18th century. The manor was home to Richard Cavendish (1794–1876)

Thornton College
Thornton College, an independent day and boarding school for girls, occupies the former Manor House Thornton Hall. The school educates girls aged 4 – 18 and has a nursery for boys and girls aged 2½ to 4. Since the Sisters of Jesus and Mary (a Catholic religious order), purchased the site in 1917, there have been a significant number of new developments at the school, most recently an award-winning Science and Prep Classroom wing (AVDC Outstanding Design Award).  A new Sixth Form department opened in 2016. The school now has over 400 pupils.

References

Sources
, available online at http://www.british-history.ac.uk/report.aspx?compid=62576

External links
 Thornton, Buckinghamshire at UK Genealogy Archive
 Thorton College boarding school official website
 Thornton Parish and College at Wolverton & District Archaeological & Historical Society

Villages in Buckinghamshire
Civil parishes in Buckinghamshire